Juan Pablo Medina de los Santos (26 June 1918 – 3 November 2019) was a centenarian from the Dominican Republic. He was the father of both Danilo Medina and Lucía Medina, who served as President of the Dominican Republic from 2012 to 2020, and House Speaker from 2016 to 2017, respectively.

Medina was born in San Juan de la Maguana on 26 June 1918. He was the son of José María Medina Báez and Lucía Blasina de los Santos. He married Amelia Sánchez and had eight children.

Medina died on 3 November 2019 at Cedimat hospital in Santo Domingo at the age of 101. He had been hospitalized several times due to intestinal bleeding and other health complications. His funeral was held at Cristo Redentor cemetery with the presence of his family and various political figures.

References

External links
Danilo Medina: ‘Mi papá fue un guerrero’
 Don Juan Pablo Medina había sido hospitalizado en varias ocasiones y falleció a los 101 años
Genealogía paterna del presidente Danilo Medina

1918 births
2019 deaths
Dominican Republic centenarians
People from San Juan Province (Dominican Republic)